Back with a Heart is the sixteenth studio album by British-Australian singer Olivia Newton-John. It was released by MCA Nashville on 12 May 1998 in the United States. Her first album in four years, it marked her return to country music after two decades.

Production and release
Back with a Heart was recorded in Nashville and marked Newton-John's return to the US Country chart after an absence of almost twenty years.

Singles
Back with a Heart was preceded by the single "I Honestly Love You", a re-recording of Newton-John's 1974 number-one hit. MCA Nashville initially intended to release "Precious Love" as the album's lead single to country radio but eventually settled on the updated version of "I Honestly Love You". Selected by Newton-John, David Foster agreed to produce the remake, who in turn asked Babyface to contribute backing vocals to the song. "I Honestly Love You" was released in two versions; the album version for pop and adult contemporary radio, and a remix for country radio. "Precious Love" was eventually released as the album's second single, while title track "Back with a Heart" was issued as a vinyl 45 RPM single in the United States. Album cut "Love Is a Gift" won a 1999 Daytime Emmy Award for Outstanding Original Song after appearing on the American television soap opera As the World Turns.

Critical reception

AllMusic editor Stephen Thomas Erlewine rated the album three stars out of five and found that Newton-John "put a great deal of effort into the making of Back with a Heart – the record is her best in years. It's much slicker than even her polished country-pop from the '70s, but a team of producers [...] have created an appealingly smooth sound that gives her a platform to showcase her mature craftsmanship. None of the songs immediately stand out, but the album has a consistent quality that is thoroughly winning."

Track listing

Personnel
Performers and musicians

 Olivia Newton-John – lead vocals, backing vocals (6, 8, 9, 10)
 Steve Nathan – keyboards (1, 2, 3, 5, 6, 7, 9), Hammond B3 organ (3)
 Dennis Burnside – acoustic piano (1, 3, 7) 
 Sean Callery – Synclavier (2)
 Barry Walsh – synthesizers (4), acoustic piano (10)
 John Hobbs – acoustic piano (8)
 David Foster – keyboards (11), arrangements (11)
 Felipe Elgueta – synthesizer programming (11)
 Mark Casstevens – acoustic guitar (1, 3, 7)
 Brent Mason – electric guitar (1, 3, 7), lead electric guitar (10)
 Bruce Bouton – pedal steel guitar (1, 3, 7), lap steel (4), slide guitar (10)
 Larry Byrom – electric guitar (2, 5, 6, 9)
 Steve Gibson – acoustic guitar (2, 9), electric guitar (5, 6)
 John Farrar – electric guitar (2, 5), backing vocals (5)
 Paul Franklin – steel guitar (2, 5, 8)
 Gary Burr – acoustic guitar (4), backing vocals (4)
 B. James Lowry – acoustic guitar (4, 10)
 Dan Dugmore – electric guitar (6), steel guitar (9)
 Chris Farren – acoustic guitar (8), mandolin (8), backing vocals (8)
 Darrell Scott – acoustic guitar (8)
 Brent Rowan – electric guitar (8)
 Cary Park – electric guitar solo (8)
 Chris Leuzinger – electric guitar (10)
 Dean Parks – guitar (11)
 Michael Thompson – guitar (11)
 Michael Rhodes – bass guitar (1, 2, 3, 5, 6, 7, 9)
 Duncan Mullins – bass guitar (4, 10)
 Joe Chemay – bass guitar (8)
 Eddie Bayers – drums (1, 2, 3, 5, 7, 10)
 Paul Leim – drums (6, 8, 9), percussion (9)
 Terry McMillan – percussion (4, 10) 
 Mark Leggett – percussion (8), programming (8)
 Rob Hajacos – fiddle (4, 10)
 Larry Franklin – fiddle (8)
 Ronn Huff – string arrangements and conductor (8)
 The Nashville String Machine – strings (8)
 Wes Hightower – backing vocals (1, 3, 7)
 Liana Manis – backing vocals (1, 3, 7)
 Dennis Wilson – backing vocals (1, 3, 7)
 Christina Nichols – backing vocals (2)
 Tabitha Fair – backing vocals (6, 9)
 Kim Fleming – backing vocals (6, 9)
 Chris Rodriguez – backing vocals (6, 9)
 Babyface – backing vocals (11)

Technical
 Producers – Don Cook (Tracks 1, 3 and 7); John Farrar (Tracks 2 and 5); Gary Burr (Tracks 4 and 10); Tony Brown (Tracks 6 and 9); Chris Farren (Track 8); David Foster (Track 11)
 Production assistance on Tracks 1, 3 and 7 – Scott Johnson
 Project coordinators – Patty Nichols (Tracks 2 and 5); Jessie Noble (Tracks 2, 5, 6 and 9); Bill Nemuth (Tracks 4 and 10); Kelly Giedt (Track 8); Felipe Elgueta (Track 11)
 Executive producers – Rory S. Kaplan and Bill Neighbors
 Recording – Mike Bradley (Tracks 1, 3 and 7); Chuck Ainlay (Tracks 2, 5, 6 and 9); Greg Kane (Tracks 4 and 10); Steve Marcantonio (Track 8); Felipe Elgueta (Track 11)
 Assistant recording – Mark Capps (Tracks 1, 3 and 7); Tim Roberts (Tracks 1, 3 and 7); Aaron Swihart (Tracks 1, 2, 3, 5, 6, 7 and 9); Mark Ralston (Tracks 2, 5, 6 and 9); King Williams (Tracks 4 and 10); John Saylor (Track 8); Chris Davie (Track 8);
 Additional recording – Mike Bradley (Tracks 1, 3 and 7); Mark Capps (Tracks 1, 3 and 7); Tim Roberts (Tracks 1, 3 and 7); Pat McMakin (Tracks 1, 3 and 7); Al Grassmick (Tracks 4 and 10); John Saylor (Track 8); Shawn Allan (Track 8); Steve Marcantonio (Track 8); Tom Harding (Track 8); Alejandro Rodriguez (Track 8); Dan Shike (Track 10)
 Overdub tracking – Steve McMillan (Tracks 2 and 5); Al Grassmick and Steve Marcantonio (Tracks 6 and 9)
 Additional overdub recording on Tracks 6 and 9 – Tony Green and Russ Martin
 Mixed by Chuck Ainlay at Masterfonics (Tracks 1, 3 and 6–11) and Moonee Pond Studios (Tracks 2 and 5), assisted by Mark Ralston
 Editing – Don Cobb
 Encoding by Jeff Levinson and Ric Wilson
 Technical support – H.G. Hollans and John Saylor
 Mastered by Denny Purcell at Georgetown Masters (Nashville, TN), assisted by Jonathan Russell
 Art direction – Gabrielle Raumberger
 Design – Joseph Kiely
 Photography – Michelle Day, Caroline Greyshock and Patrick McDermott
 Stylist – Mini DeBlasio

Charts

Weekly charts

Year-end charts

Release history

References

1998 albums
Olivia Newton-John albums
Albums produced by John Farrar
Albums produced by David Foster
Albums produced by Tony Brown (record producer)